Mesitylene or 1,3,5-trimethylbenzene is a derivative of benzene with three methyl substituents positioned symmetrically around the ring. The other two isomeric trimethylbenzenes are 1,2,4-trimethylbenzene (pseudocumene) and 1,2,3-trimethylbenzene (hemimellitene). All three compounds have the formula C6H3(CH3)3, which is commonly abbreviated C6H3Me3. Mesitylene is a colorless liquid with sweet aromatic odor. It is a component of coal tar, which is its traditional source. It is a precursor to diverse fine chemicals. The mesityl group (Mes) is a substituent with the formula C6H2Me3 and is found in various other compounds.

Preparation
Mesitylene is prepared by transalkylation of xylene over solid acid catalyst:
2 C6H4(CH3)2 ⇌ C6H3(CH3)3 + C6H5CH3
C6H4(CH3)2 + CH3OH → C6H3(CH3)3 + H2O

Although impractical, it could be prepared by trimerization of propyne, also requiring an acid catalyst, yields a mixture of 1,3,5- and 1,2,4-trimethylbenzenes.

Trimerization of acetone via aldol condensation, which is catalyzed and dehydrated by sulfuric acid is another method of synthesizing mesitylene.

Reactions
Oxidation of mesitylene with nitric acid yields trimesic acid, C6H3(COOH)3. Using manganese dioxide, a milder oxidising agent, 3,5-dimethylbenzaldehyde is formed.  Mesitylene is oxidised by trifluoroperacetic acid to produce mesitol (2,4,6-trimethylphenol). Bromination occurs readily, giving mesityl bromide:
(CH3)3C6H3 + Br2 → (CH3)3C6H2Br + HBr

Mesitylene is a ligand in organometallic chemistry, one example being the organomolybdenum complex  which can be prepared from molybdenum hexacarbonyl.

Applications
Mesitylene is mainly used as a precursor to 2,4,6-trimethylaniline, a precursor to colorants. This derivative is prepared by selective mononitration of mesitylene, avoiding oxidation of the methyl groups.

Niche uses
]
Mesitylene is used in the laboratory as a specialty solvent. In the electronics industry, mesitylene has been used as a developer for photopatternable silicones due to its solvent properties.

The three aromatic hydrogen atoms of mesitylene are in identical chemical shift environments. Therefore, they only give a single peak near 6.8 ppm in the 1H NMR spectrum; the same is also true for the nine methyl protons, which give a singlet near 2.3 ppm. For this reason, mesitylene is sometimes used as an internal standard in NMR samples that contain aromatic protons.

Uvitic acid is obtained by oxidizing mesitylene or by condensing pyruvic acid with baryta water.

The Gattermann reaction can be simplified by replacing the HCN/AlCl3 combination with zinc cyanide (Zn(CN)2). Although it is highly toxic, Zn(CN)2 is a solid, making it safer to work with than gaseous hydrogen cyanide (HCN). The Zn(CN)2 reacts with the HCl to form the key HCN reactant and ZnCl2 that serves as the Lewis-acid catalyst in-situ. An example of the Zn(CN)2 method is the synthesis of mesitaldehyde from mesitylene.

History
Mesitylene was first prepared in 1837 by Robert Kane, an Irish chemist, by heating acetone with concentrated sulfuric acid. He named his new substance "mesitylene" because the German chemist Carl Reichenbach had named acetone "mesit" (from the Greek μεσίτης, the mediator), and Kane believed that his reaction had dehydrated mesit, converting it to an alkene, "mesitylene". However, Kane's determination of the chemical composition ("empirical formula") of mesitylene was incorrect. The correct empirical formula was provided by August W. von Hofmann in 1849. In 1866 Adolf von Baeyer gave a correct mesitylene's empirical formula; however, with a wrong structure of tetracyclo[3.1.1.11,3.13,5]nonane. A conclusive proof that mesitylene was trimethylbenzene was provided by Albert Ladenburg in 1874; however, assuming wrong benzene structure of prismane.

Mesityl group
The group (CH3)3C6H2- is called mesityl (organic group symbol: Mes). Mesityl derivatives, e.g. tetramesityldiiron, are typically prepared from the Grignard reagent (CH3)3C6H2MgBr.  Due to its large steric demand, the mesityl group is used as a large blocking group in asymmetric catalysis (to enhance diastereo- or enantioselectivity) and organometallic chemistry (to stabilize low oxidation state or low coordination number metal centers).  Larger analogues with even greater steric demand, for example 2,6-diisopropylphenyl (Dipp) and the analogously named Tripp ((iPr)3C6H2, Is) and supermesityl ((tBu)3C6H2, Mes*) groups, may be even more effective toward achieving these goals.

Safety and the environment
Mesitylene is also a major urban volatile organic compound (VOC) which results from combustion. It plays a significant role in aerosol and tropospheric ozone formation as well as other reactions in atmospheric chemistry.

References

Hydrocarbon solvents
Alkylbenzenes
C3-Benzenes
Aromatic solvents